Sir Henry Seymour (c. 1503 – 5 April 1578) was an English landowner and MP, the brother of Jane Seymour, queen consort of Henry VIII, and consequently uncle to Edward VI. He was created a Knight of the Bath after his nephew's coronation.

Family
Sir Henry Seymour was born around 1503, probably at Wulfhall, Wiltshire. He was the third son of Sir John Seymour (c.1474 – 21 December 1536.) and Margery Wentworth (c. 1478 – 18 October 1550).  His family rose to prominence following his sister Jane's marriage to the King in 1536. As well as Queen Jane, Henry Seymour's siblings included Elizabeth Seymour, Lady Cromwell, the daughter-in-law of Henry VIII's chief minister, Thomas Cromwell; Edward Seymour, 1st Duke of Somerset, who was Lord Protector of England during the minority of their nephew; and Thomas Seymour, 1st Baron Seymour of Sudeley, the fourth husband of Catherine Parr, and stepfather to the future Elizabeth I.

Career
Seymour may have begun his career in the service of Richard Foxe, Bishop of Winchester. By 1526 he had followed his father and siblings into royal service, although he does not seem to have shared the ambitions or abilities of his brothers, Edward and Thomas, and did not progress at court. He served under four Tudor monarchs, although for the most part, he lived in relative obscurity and did not seek honours and preferments.

He held a number of offices, including:

 Keeper, Taunton Castle, Somerset by 1526–1578
 Keeper, Bridgwater Castle, Somerset 1544 
 Keeper, Marwell park, Hampshire by 1547–51
 Sewer extraordinary, the chamber by 1533
 Bailiff, manor of Hampstead Marshall, Berkshire 1536–1578 
 Bailiff, Romsey, Hampshire by 1546–1578
 Steward, manors of Bierton with Broughton, Whaddon and Wendover, Buckinghamshire 1536, Wyrardisbury, Buckinghamshire and Kings Langley, Hertfordshire 1536–39
 General–receiver, manors of Bierton with Broughton, Claydon, Swanbourne, Wendover and Whaddon, Buckinghamshire, Berkhampstead, Hertfordshire and Finmere, Oxfordshire 1536-10
 Captain Lyon of Hamburgh 1544
 Carver, household of Anne of Cleves 1540
 Carver, household of Catherine Parr by 1544
 Commissioner, relief, Hampshire 1550
 Commissioner, goods of churches and fraternities 1553
  Justice of the Peace 1554–1578
 Sheriff, Hampshire 1568–9

He was, presumably, the Henry Semer who was Catherine of Aragon's carver. In 1536 he appears to have replaced Mark Smeaton in the privy chamber and following his sister's marriage, he was appointed to several offices chiefly related to the administration of her estates, some of which he lost at her death. Jane left him "several valuable chains" in her will in 1537. He was carver in the households of Anne of Cleves (1540) and Catherine Parr (1545). The queen's jewels were placed in his custody in November 1541 following Catherine Howard's arrest. In 1544 he was made captain of the ship Lyon of Hamburgh under the command of his brother Thomas, Lord High Admiral, but was held to be culpable when in November it foundered in the Dart estuary during a storm. He was offered no further military or naval command following this incident, and some time in 1545, lost his position in the household of Catherine Parr.

He was made a Knight of the Bath in February 1547, soon after his nephew's accession to the throne. In the autumn of 1547, he was elected MP for Hampshire. He is not mentioned in the diaries of Edward VI, although he received a number of royal grants of land during the reign of his nephew. While both his brothers were executed after conspiring against their rivals in their struggles for power, Henry Seymour appears unscathed. In 1549, his brother, Edward, Lord Protector of England, wrote to him and asked him to bring troops to support him. It seems Henry Seymour did not respond, and did well under the administration of his brother's replacement, John Dudley, 1st Duke of Northumberland. He was the sole executor of his mother's Will following her death on 18 October 1550,  by which she bequeathed "various legacies of plate, jewels etc. to her relations."  In 1551, he was granted the manors of Marwell and Twyford, which had constituted a portion of the estates of the bishopric of Winchester, and the following year, grants for life of the manors of Somerford and Hurn, in the parish of Christchurch, with other lands to the value of £202 6s. 9d.

During the reign of Elizabeth I, he was High Sheriff of Hampshire for 1568–69.

Marriage and issue
Henry Seymour married Barbara (born c. 1515), the daughter of Morgan Wolfe, and by her had three sons and seven daughters, of whom:
 Sir John Seymour married Susan, youngest daughter of Lord Chidiock Powlett, third son of William Paulet, 1st Marquess of Winchester and Elizabeth, daughter of Sir William Capel, Lord Mayor of London. They had three sons:
 Edward Seymour
 Henry Seymour
 Thomas Seymour
 Jane Seymour (died February 1634) married Sir John Rodney (c. 1551–died 6 August 1612) of Stoke Rodney, Somersetshire. They had sixteen children, of whom four sons and three daughters survived including:
 Elizabeth Rodney
 Sir Edward Rodney (1590-1657) married Frances Southwell, the daughter of Sir Robert Southwell of Woodrising, Norfolk and Lady Elizabeth Howard, and by her had thirteen children.
George Rodney (1608–1630) who married Anna Lake and had issue. He was the ancestor of George Brydges Rodney, 1st Baron Rodney (1718 – 24 May 1792)
 William Rodney (1610-1669) who married Alice Caesar and had issue.

Death
Seymour died at home in Winchester 5 April 1578. He had made his will a week earlier. He was succeeded by his son and heir, John.

Notes

References

External links
 Seymour, Sir Henry (by 1503–78), of Marwell, Hants. (biography), historyofparliamentonline.org. Accessed 25 January 2023.

1503 births
1578 deaths
Politicians from Winchester
People from Wiltshire
Knights of the Bath
English MPs 1547–1552
English justices of the peace
Henry
High Sheriffs of Hampshire